The Ice Man Cometh is Jerry Butler's eleventh album, released in 1968 (see 1968 in music).

Track listing
All tracks composed by Jerry Butler, Kenneth Gamble and Leon Huff; except where indicated.
"Hey, Western Union Man" - 2:41
"Can't Forget About You, Baby" (Butler, Gamble) - 2:40
"Only the Strong Survive" - 2:38
"How Can I Get in Touch With You" - 2:28
"Just Because I Really Love You" - 2:38
"Lost" - 2:40
"Never Give You Up" - 2:59
"Are You Happy" (Gamble, Thom Bell, Butler) - 2:41
"(Strange) I Still Love You" (Butler, Mikki Farrow, Harris) - 2:53
"Go Away - Find Yourself" - 2:53
"I Stop by Heaven" - 3:21

Production credits
Bobby Martin - Arranger
Thom Bell - Arranger
Roland Chambers - Arranger
Joe Tarsia - Engineer
Jay Thompson - photography

Billboard charts

References

1968 albums
Jerry Butler albums
Albums arranged by Thom Bell
Albums produced by Kenneth Gamble
Albums produced by Leon Huff
Mercury Records albums
Disco albums by American artists